Jason Death (pronounced (born 25 August 1971) is an Australian former professional rugby league footballer who played in the 1990s and 2000s.

Background
Born in Young, New South Wales, Death attended Lake Ginninderra College in Canberra, where he represented the Australian Schoolboys in 1989 and 1990, before being signed by the Canberra Raiders.

Playing career

Canberra Raiders
In round 2 of the 1991 NSWRL season, Death made his first grade debut for Canberra in a 48–10 win over the Parramatta Eels. At the end of the season, he was named the club's Rookie of the Year. In 1994, after just 16 games over the previous two seasons, Death played 16 games and featured in the side's qualifying final and preliminary final wins. He missed out on playing in the Grand Final winning side despite being named on the interchange bench. In 1995, Death featured prominently again, playing 21 times, including the club's preliminary final loss to the Sydney Bulldogs.

North Queensland Cowboys
In 1996, Death joined the North Queensland Cowboys after Tim Sheens, Death's coach at the Raiders who was set to join the Cowboys in 1997, recommended he sign with the club. In 1997, Death played just eight games, stuck behind former Raiders' teammate Steve Walters, who had joined the club that year. In 1998, his final season in Townsville, he played 17 games, mostly at lock. In Round 22 of the 1998 season, he played his 100th first grade game in a 10–22 loss to the Brisbane Broncos.

Warriors
In 1999, joined the then-Auckland Warriors, playing 18 games and winning the club's Player of the Year award. In 2001, Death played 21 games for the re-branded New Zealand Warriors, which included playing in the club's first finals game, a 12–56 loss to the Parramatta Eels.

South Sydney Rabbitohs
In 2002, Death returned to Australia, signing with the South Sydney Rabbitohs, who had just been readmitted into the competition. Death started 23 games at hooker for the Rabbitohs, winning the team's Clubman of the Year award. Over the next two seasons, Death played 21 games before retiring at the end of the 2004 season. In Round 9 of the 2004 season, Death played his 200th game, a 4–38 loss to the Penrith Panthers.

Achievements and accolades

Individual
Canberra Raiders Rookie of the Year: 1991
New Zealand Warriors Player of the Year: 1999
South Sydney Rabbitohs Clubman of the Year: 2002, 2003

Statistics

NSWRL/ARL/Super League/NRL

Personal life
Death is the brother-in-law of former Warriors teammate Ivan Cleary and Josh Stuart, as Death and Cleary are married to Stuart's sisters. Death's nephew, Nathan Cleary, is a New South Wales State of Origin representative.

References

1971 births
Living people
Australian rugby league players
Canberra Raiders players
New Zealand Warriors players
North Queensland Cowboys players
Rugby league hookers
Rugby league locks
Rugby league players from Young, New South Wales
South Sydney Rabbitohs players
South Sydney Rabbitohs captains